Fordyce School District 39  is a public school district in Fordyce, Arkansas, United States.

The school district encompasses  of land, in Dallas County and Calhoun County.

Most of the district is in Dallas County, and there it includes Fordyce, Ivan, and Princeton. The district extends into Calhoun County.

In 2014 Albert Snow, the superintendent of the Norphlet School District, was to become the Fordyce superintendent.

History 
In 1965 the Dallas County School District dissolved, with a portion of the students going to the Fordyce school district.

Schools 
 Fordyce Elementary School
 Fordyce High School

References

External links

 

Education in Calhoun County, Arkansas
Education in Dallas County, Arkansas
School districts in Arkansas
Fordyce, Arkansas